The Cranbrook Royals were a senior men's AAA level ice hockey team that played in the Western International Hockey League from 1965 to 1987. 

The Cranbrook Royals won the Allan Cup as senior ice hockey champions of Canada in 1982.

References

Western International Hockey League teams
Defunct ice hockey teams in Canada
Ice hockey teams in British Columbia
Ice hockey clubs established  in 1965
Ice hockey clubs disestablished in 1987
1965 establishments in British Columbia
1987 disestablishments in British Columbia